The 1986 NCAA Division I women's soccer tournament was the fifth annual single-elimination tournament to determine the national champion of NCAA women's collegiate soccer. The championship game was played again at George Mason Stadium in Fairfax, Virginia during December 1986.

North Carolina defeated Colorado College in the final, 2–0, to win their fourth national title. Coached by Anson Dorrance, the Tar Heels finished the season 23–0–1. This was the first of North Carolina's record nine consecutive national titles (1986–1994).

The most outstanding player was April Heinrichs from North Carolina. An All-Tournament team, consisting of five players, was also named. Henrichs was also the tournament's leading scorer (4 goals).

Qualification
With the inaugural edition of the NCAA Division III Women's Soccer Championship being held in 1986, the tournament eligibility was narrowed to just Division I and Division II women's soccer programs (a Division II championship was not added until 1988). Nonetheless, the tournament field decreased from the previous year, downsizing from 14 to 12 teams.

Bracket

All tournament team
April Heinrichs, North Carolina (Most outstanding player)
Angela Berry, George Mason
Betsy Drambour, George Mason
Lisa Gmitter, George Mason
Kim Maslin, George Mason

See also 
 NCAA Division I women's soccer championship
 NCAA Division III Women's Soccer Championship (begun 1986)
 1986 NCAA Division I Men's Soccer Championship

References

NCAA Division I Tournament
NCAA Women's Soccer Championship
 
NCAA Division I Women's Soccer Tournament